Pierre Paul Louis Albert César Descamps (15 October 1916 – 19 April 1992) was a Belgian politician and burgomaster for the PLP.

Descamps was born in Ath; he was a licentiate in philosophy and literature and an industrialist. He was burgomaster of Aubechies and Belœil and senator (1961–1985) for the PLP. Descamps was President of the PVV-PLP in 1969–1972.  He died in Bordeaux, aged 75.

Sources
 Presidents of the Belgian liberal party

References 

1916 births
1992 deaths
Belgian Ministers of State
People from Ath